Last Hero 3 (Posledniy Geroy 3) - 3rd season of Russian Last Hero show, hosted by Nikolai Fomenko

Contestants

The Total Votes is the number of votes a castaway has received during Tribal Councils where the castaway is eligible to be voted out of the game. It does not include the votes received during the final Tribal Council.

Last Hero seasons
2003 Russian television seasons
Television shows filmed in the Dominican Republic